Chew Wei Lun (born 26 April 1995) is a Malaysian boccia player. 

At the 2020 Summer Paralympics, he won the silver medal in the individual BC1 event, thus becoming the first Malaysian to win a medal in boccia.

References

1995 births
Living people
People from Johor Bahru
Malaysian people of Chinese descent
Paralympic medalists in boccia
Boccia players at the 2020 Summer Paralympics
Medalists at the 2020 Summer Paralympics
Paralympic boccia players of Malaysia
Paralympic silver medalists for Malaysia